Nyein Chan Aung (born 18 August 1996) is a Burmese professional footballer who plays as midfielder for Maung Trang United and the Myanmar national team. He was called up to national senior team in 2014 and scored a goal on his debut against Maldives national football team in 2014 AFC Challenge Cup.

Club

Early life 
Nyein Chan Aung was born on 18 August 1996 in Myitkyina, Kachin State, Myanmar. Before 2015 U-20 World Cup, He got a knee problem and missed the World Cup.

Club career

2022
In 2022, He transferred to Nakhon Si United from Yangon United.

Club

International career 
He first appeared in the Myanmar under-16 team that took part at the 2011 AFF U-16 Youth Championship. He scored 3 goals at the 2014 AFC U-19 Championship, which was hosted by Myanmar and became one of the key players who led Myanmar to their first ever FIFA U-20 World Cup.

International goals
Scores and results list Myanmar's goal tally first.

Honours

Hassanal Bolkiah Trophy: 2014

References

External links

1996 births
Living people
People from Myitkyina
Burmese footballers
Myanmar international footballers
Association football forwards
Yangon United F.C. players
Nakhon Si United F.C. players